The 1940 edition of the Campeonato Carioca kicked off on April 21, 1940 and ended on December 22, 1940. It was organized by LFRJ (Liga de Futebol do Rio de Janeiro, or Rio de Janeiro Football League). Nine teams participated. Fluminense won the title for the 13th time. no teams were relegated.

System
The tournament would be disputed in a triple round-robin format, with the team with the most points winning the title.

Championship

References

Campeonato Carioca seasons
Carioca